John Edward Ericks II (born September 16, 1967) is a former Major League Baseball pitcher who was a first-round draft pick in 1988 by the St. Louis Cardinals. He played for three seasons for the Pittsburgh Pirates from 1995 to 1997, appearing in 57 career games. 

A native of Tinley Park, Illinois, Ericks attended the University of Illinois at Urbana-Champaign, and in 1987 he played collegiate summer baseball with the Chatham A's of the Cape Cod Baseball League.

References

External links

1967 births
Living people
Pittsburgh Pirates players
Major League Baseball pitchers
Baseball players from Illinois
Illinois Fighting Illini baseball players
Chatham Anglers players
American expatriate baseball players in Canada
Arkansas Travelers players
Calgary Cannons players
Carolina Mudcats players
Gulf Coast Pirates players
Johnson City Cardinals players
Salem Buccaneers players
Savannah Cardinals players
St. Petersburg Cardinals players